Yordan Hernando Osorio Paredes (born 10 May 1994) is a Venezuelan professional footballer who plays as a centre-back for Serie B club Parma and the Venezuela national team.

Formed at Zamora FC, he spent most of his career in Europe, representing Tondela, Porto and Vitória de Guimarães in the Portuguese Primeira Liga, Zenit in the Russian Premier League and Parma in Serie A in Italy. He won a league and cup double on loan at Zenit in 2020.

A full international for Venezuela from 2017, Osorio represented the nation at the 2019 Copa América.

Club career

Zamora / Tondela
Born in Barinas, Osorio began his career at hometown club Zamora F.C. in the Venezuelan Primera División, where he won three league titles. In January 2017, he joined C.D. Tondela in Portugal's Primeira Liga on a contract lasting until 2021.

Osorio made his debut for Tondela on 22 January 2017 in a 4–0 loss at S.L. Benfica, as a 79th-minute substitute for Fernando Ferreira. Six days later, he started at home to G.D. Chaves and scored his first goal to open a 2–0 win. In late April, he scored in consecutive wins over Rio Ave F.C. and C.D. Nacional at the Estádio João Cardoso, as his team avoided relegation on goal difference over F.C. Arouca.

Porto
On 31 January 2018, Osorio moved to league leaders FC Porto on loan for the remainder of the season with an option to buy. He made only one appearance as the Dragons won the title, a 2–0 loss at C.F. Os Belenenses on 2 April, starting in place of the suspended Iván Marcano; a communication error with his defensive partner Felipe led to the first goal.

Having signed a Porto contract lasting until 2022, Osorio moved on loan to Vitória S.C. on 5 July 2018 for the season. He played 30 total matches for the team from Guimarães and scored twice, including one on 19 May 2019 on the final day of the season to win 3–1 at neighbours Moreirense F.C. to seal fifth place, qualifying for the UEFA Europa League at their expense.

On 31 August 2019, Osorio was loaned to FC Zenit Saint Petersburg for the season, with the option to buy. He made his debut on 17 September in the UEFA Champions League opening group game away to Olympique Lyonnais, a 1–1 draw. His team won the double of Russian Premier League and Russian Cup, though he played only seven times in the former and missed the latter final win over FC Khimki.

Parma
Osorio left Porto on 5 October 2020, when he joined Italy's Parma Calcio 1913 on a four-year deal for an estimated fee of €4 million. He made his debut on 7 November in the seventh game of the Serie A season, a goalless home draw with ACF Fiorentina, and finished with 23 appearances as his team were relegated.

International career

Osorio was first called up for Venezuela in May 2017, for friendlies against the United States and Ecuador. He made his debut on 4 June in a 1–1 draw with the Americans at the Rio Tinto Stadium in Utah, replacing José Manuel Velázquez after 56 minutes.

Manager Rafael Dudamel called up Osorio to his 23-man squad for the 2019 Copa América in Brazil. He played one of their four matches as they reached the quarter-finals, a goalless draw with the hosts in the second group match on 18 June.

Osorio was one of several Venezuelan players to miss the 2021 Copa América through injury.

Honours
Zamora
Venezuelan Primera División: 2013–14, 2015, 2016

Porto
Primeira Liga: 2017–18

Zenit Saint Petersburg
Russian Premier League: 2019–20
 Russian Cup: 2019–20

References

External links

 

1994 births
Living people
People from Barinas (state)
Venezuelan footballers
Venezuela international footballers
Association football defenders
Venezuelan Primera División players
Primeira Liga players
Russian Premier League players
Serie A players
Serie B players
Zamora FC players
C.D. Tondela players
FC Porto players
Vitória S.C. players
FC Zenit Saint Petersburg players
Parma Calcio 1913 players
Venezuelan expatriate footballers
Venezuelan expatriate sportspeople in Portugal
Expatriate footballers in Portugal
Venezuelan expatriate sportspeople in Russia
Expatriate footballers in Russia
Venezuelan expatriate sportspeople in Italy
Expatriate footballers in Italy
2019 Copa América players